Escuela de Fútbol Club Deportivo Algar is a Spanish football club based in El Algar, Cartagena in the Region of Murcia. Founded in 1930, they play in Preferente Autonómica de Murcia – Group 1, holding home games at Estadio Sánchez Luengo, with a capacity of 1,000 seats.

Season to season

5 seasons in Tercera División

Notes

References

External links
 
Soccerway team profile

1930 establishments in Spain
Association football clubs established in 1930
Football clubs in the Region of Murcia
Sport in Cartagena, Spain
FC Cartagena